Grace Kelley (born 1894, date of death missing) was an American politician in the state of Washington. She served in the Washington House of Representatives from 1949 to 1951 for district 21.

References

Year of death missing
1894 births
Democratic Party members of the Washington House of Representatives
Women state legislators in Washington (state)